Westlake Village is a census-designated place (CDP) in Winnebago County, Illinois, United States. It is in the western part of the county, in the southeast part of Pecatonica Township, with a small portion extending east into Burritt Township. It is built around a golf course and a small reservoir (Westlake) on Coolidge Creek.

Westlake Village was first listed as a CDP prior to the 2020 census.

Demographics

References

External links
Westlake Village Homeowners Association

Census-designated places in Winnebago County, Illinois
Census-designated places in Illinois